The administrator of the United States Agency for International Development is the head of the United States federal government's Agency for International Development (USAID). 

The administrator is officially nominated by the president of the United States and confirmed by the United States Senate. A 2017 reorganisation of the US National Security Council, placed the USAID administrator as a permanent member on the Deputies Committee.

The position was vacant  from November 6, 2020, until January 20, 2021, as acting Administrator John Barsa had been forced to resign under the requirements of the Federal Vacancies Reform Act of 1998. Instead of nominating Barsa and sending it to the U.S. Senate, President Donald Trump fired Deputy Administrator Bonnie Glick and named Barsa to her position in an acting capacity, while keeping the administrator's position vacant. As a result, Barsa remained the agency's top executive. The Biden administration nominated Samantha Power to become the next administrator, and she was confirmed by the Senate on a vote of 68–26.

List of administrators

References

External links
 USAID Leadership

United States Agency for International Development
1961 establishments in Washington, D.C.